Sally Pearson, OAM (née McLellan; born 19 September 1986) is a retired Australian athlete who competed on the 100 metre hurdles. She is the 2011 and 2017 World champion and 2012 Olympic champion in the 100 metres hurdles. She also won a silver medal in the 100 m hurdles at the 2008 Summer Olympics and the 2013 World Championships.

Athletic career
Sally Pearson was born in Sydney and moved to Birdsville, Queensland when she was eight years old, before eventually settling on the Gold Coast. It was there, while she was still in primary school, that her athletic talents were noticed by Sharon Hannan, who coached her until 2013. Pearson rose to prominence in 2001, when at the age of only 14, she won the Australian Youth 100 m and 90 m hurdles titles. After injury setbacks during 2002 she made her international debut at the 2003 World Youth Championships in Sherbrooke, Canada and won gold in the 100 m hurdles. The following month, still only 16 years old, she represented Australia at open level at the 2003 World Championships in Paris, France as part of the 4 × 100 m relay team. In 2004, she won a bronze in the 100 m at the World Junior Championships, and just missed out on a medal in the 100 m hurdles.

At the 2006 Commonwealth Games in Melbourne, Pearson tripped over a hurdle and fell to the ground during the 100 m hurdles final, costing her the chance of a medal. In 2007, she continued to pursue both the 100 m and the 100 m hurdles, making the semi-final of each event at the World Championships in Osaka, Japan. However, in the lead up to the 2008 Olympic Games, she shifted her focus solely to the 100 m hurdles. This decision paid off, with Pearson claiming the silver medal in a dramatic final, where the favourite Lolo Jones stumbled and a photo finish was required to decide the minor medals. After the announcement of the official results a jubilant Pearson celebrated enthusiastically with bronze medal winner Priscilla Lopes-Schliep, and gave an emotional trackside interview.

Pearson was in good form during the 2009 European season, winning five out of seven races and breaking the Australian and Oceanian record in the 100 m hurdles at the Herculis meeting in July, with a time of 12.50 seconds; 0.03 faster than the area record she had set on the same track a year earlier. However, she was hampered by back spasms in the lead up to the World Championships in Berlin, and was only able to finish fifth in the 100 m hurdles final.

2010 Commonwealth Games
At the 2010 Commonwealth Games in Delhi, India, Pearson competed in the 100 m sprint in addition to the 100 m hurdles. In the final of the 100 m she recorded a false start, along with English runner Laura Turner, but was allowed to line up for the restart, crossing the finish line first in a time of 11.28s. However a protest was lodged after the race, which resulted in a distraught Pearson being disqualified. Three nights later she went on to win gold in the 100 m hurdles final in 12.67 seconds. Pearson was also controversially included in the Australian team for the final of the women's 4 × 400 m relay, an event she had not trained for, and collapsed after running the anchor leg, the Australian team having finished in fifth place. Even though she thought she had let the team down, her teammates comforted her.

At the beginning of the next season, she won the 100 m, 200 m and 100 m hurdles to become the first Australian woman to win three national titles at the same event since Pam Kilborn had done in 1968.

2011 World championships

At the 2011 World Championships in Daegu, South Korea, Pearson ran a 100m hurdles time of 12.28s (+1.1), the fourth fastest time in history, following the semi-finals where she produced the equal fifth fastest time in history of 12.36s (+0.3) to beat her own Oceanian area record and Australian national record.

2012 Olympics
Coming into the 2012 London Olympics, for the 100m hurdles Pearson had won 32 races from 34 starts. She led the competition after Round 1 heats with 12.57 and lead coming into the final with a semi-final time of 12.39. Pearson won gold with a new Olympic record time of 12.35s (Wind (m/s): -0.2) beating out Americans Dawn Harper, 12.37, and Kellie Wells, 12.48, who both recorded personal bests.

2015
At the Golden Gala, Pearson fell over a hurdle badly mid-race. She suffered a "bone explosion" of her left forearm and broke her wrist. The traumatic injury ruined the remainder of her 2015 season.

2016
Sally Pearson was set to be a strong contender to defend her gold medal title she won at the London 2012 Olympics. However, during a hard training session Pearson slightly tore her hamstring forcing her out of the Rio 2016 games.

2017 World championships
Pearson won the gold medal in the 100 metres hurdles at the 2017 World Championships in London with a time of 12.59.

2018 Commonwealth Games
Pearson was to compete in the 100 metre hurdles and 4x100 relay but later withdrew due to an Achilles tendon injury.

Retirement
On 5 August 2019, Pearson announced her retirement from competitive athletics, stating that she did not believe that she would be ready for the 2020 Olympic Games. Pearson stated: "It has been a long 16 years, but also a fun and exciting 16 years. My body has decided it is time to let it go, and move forward onto a new direction." She is the eighth fastest 100m hurdles sprinter in history.

Recognition
2008/2009 – Athletics Australia Female Athlete of the Year.
2011 – Female Athlete of the Year. She is the first Australian to receive this award. Pearson also received prizemoney of  98,800($US76,117).
2011 – "Key to the City of Gold Coast". 
2012 – Athletics Australia Female Athlete of the Year.
2012 – Sport Australia Hall of Fame The Don Award
2012 – Queensland Sports Star of the Year.
2013 – National Finalist Young Australian of the Year
2014 – Medal of the Order of Australia (OAM) for service to sport as a gold medallist at the London 2012 Olympic Games.
2014 – Sport Australia Hall of Fame The Don Award.
2014 – Women's Health Sports Woman
2017 – Australian Institute of Sport Female Athlete of the Year
2017 – Athletics Australia Female Athlete of the Year.
2018 – Gold Coast 2018 Commonwealth Games final Queens Baton Relay runner

Personal life

Pearson was raised by her single mother Anne, who worked two jobs to make enough money to support her daughter's athletic career. In late 2008 she became engaged to Kieran Pearson, the pair having been together since their senior year at Helensvale State High School on Queensland's Gold Coast. In April 2010 they married on the Gold Coast, and had their honeymoon in Los Angeles and Hawaii.

Achievements

Personal bests
 100 metres – 11.14 secs (2007)
 200 metres – 22.97 secs (2015)
 100 metres hurdles – 12.28 secs (2011) (eighth fastest time in history)

Records

References

External links

 
 
 

1986 births
Living people
Sportspeople from the Gold Coast, Queensland
Sportswomen from New South Wales
Sportswomen from Queensland
Athletes from Sydney
Australian female hurdlers
Australian female sprinters
Olympic athletes of Australia
Olympic gold medalists for Australia
Olympic silver medalists for Australia
Commonwealth Games medallists in athletics
Athletes (track and field) at the 2008 Summer Olympics
Athletes (track and field) at the 2012 Summer Olympics
Medalists at the 2008 Summer Olympics
Medalists at the 2012 Summer Olympics
Commonwealth Games bronze medallists for Australia
Commonwealth Games gold medallists for Australia
Athletes (track and field) at the 2006 Commonwealth Games
Athletes (track and field) at the 2010 Commonwealth Games
Athletes (track and field) at the 2014 Commonwealth Games
World Athletics Championships athletes for Australia
World Athletics Championships medalists
Olympic gold medalists in athletics (track and field)
Olympic silver medalists in athletics (track and field)
Recipients of the Medal of the Order of Australia
World Athletics Championships winners
Diamond League winners
World Athletics Indoor Championships winners
IAAF Continental Cup winners
Medallists at the 2010 Commonwealth Games
Medallists at the 2014 Commonwealth Games